Ziradei (also spelt Jiradei) is one of the administrative divisions of Siwan district in the Indian state of Bihar.

Geography
Ziradei is located at

History and people
Rajendra Prasad, the first President of India was from Ziradei.

Panchayats
Panchayats in Ziradei community development block are: Akolhi, Mairwa, Don Bazar, Gangpaliya, Badhenya, Bharauli, Chandauli Gangauli, Chandpali, Chhotaka Manjha, Garar, Hasua, Jamapur, Manjhawalia, Miya Ke Bhatkan, Narindrapur, Sakara, Thepaha, Titara and Ziradei .

Demographics
As per 2001 census, Ziradei block had a population of 138,078.

Personalities
Dr. Rajendra Prasad, the first President of India, was born at Ziradei on 3 December 1884. 

Mithilesh Kumar Srivastava, better known as Natwarlal, was a noted Indian con man known for having repeatedly "sold" the Taj Mahal, the Red Fort, and the Rashtrapati Bhavan and also the Parliament House of India along with its 545 sitting members. He was also born in Bangra a small village in Ziradei constituency Siwan, by profession he was a lawyer before he turned into a conman.

See also

Ziradei (Vidhan Sabha constituency)
2015 Bihar Legislative Assembly election

References

Community development blocks in Siwan district